César Romero Marques dos Santos (born 12 March 1980), known as just César Romero, is a Brazilian football player who currently plays for Araxá Esporte Clube.

External links
 Profile
 Globo Profile

1980 births
Living people
Brazilian footballers
Brazilian expatriate footballers
Paraná Clube players
FC Dinamo Tbilisi players
ND Gorica players
Slovenian PrvaLiga players
Fehérvár FC players
J. Malucelli Futebol players
Expatriate footballers in Slovenia
Expatriate footballers in Hungary
Association football midfielders